Statistics of Primera Fuerza in season 1937-38.

Overview
It was contested by 6 teams, and Necaxa won the championship.

League standings

Moves
After this season Euzkadi joined for the 1938-39 season.

Top goalscorers
Players sorted first by goals scored, then by last name.

References
Mexico - List of final tables (RSSSF)

1937-38
Mex
1937–38 in Mexican football